The 2019–20 Maryland Terrapins men's basketball team represented the University of Maryland, College Park in the 2019–20 NCAA Division I men's basketball season. They were led by ninth-year head coach Mark Turgeon and played their home games at Xfinity Center in College Park, Maryland, as members of the Big Ten Conference.

With a win over Michigan on March 8, 2020, the Terrapins earned a share of their first-ever Big Ten regular season championship. They finished the season 24–7, 14–6 in Big Ten play to finish in a three-way tie for first place. Their season ended following the cancellation of postseason tournaments due to the coronavirus pandemic.

Previous season
The Terrapins finished the 2018–19 season 23–11, 13–7 in Big Ten play to finish in fifth place. They lost in the second round of the Big Ten tournament to Nebraska. They received an at-large bid to the NCAA tournament as the No. 6 seed in the East region. There they defeated Belmont before losing to LSU in the second round.

Offseason

Coaching changes
In May 2019, assistant Kevin Broadus was hired as the new head coach at Morgan State. Turgeon hired DeAndre Haynes as Broadus' replacement in June 2019.

Departures

Recruiting classes

2019 recruiting class

2020 Recruiting class

Roster

Depth chart

Makhi and Makhel Mitchell entered the transfer portal in December 2019, leaving the team.

Schedule and results

|-
!colspan=9 style=|Exhibition

|-
!colspan=9 style=|Regular season

|-
!colspan=9 style=|
|-
!colspan=9 style=|Cancelled
|-
!colspan=9 style=|
|-
!colspan=9 style=|Cancelled

Rankings

^Coaches did not release a Week 2 poll.
*AP does not release post-NCAA Tournament rankings

References

Maryland Terrapins men's basketball seasons
Maryland
Terra
Terra